Burmjapyx is a genus of diplurans in the family Japygidae.

Species
 Burmjapyx goliath (Parona, 1888)
 Burmjapyx lienhardi Pagés, 2000
 Burmjapyx longiseta (Silvestri, 1908)
 Burmjapyx megurus Silvestri, 1948
 Burmjapyx molineti (Silvestri, 1929)
 Burmjapyx murphyi Pagés, 2000
 Burmjapyx oudemansi (Parona, 1892)
 Burmjapyx paronae Silvestri, 1931

References

Diplura